Dinavon Bythwood (born May 23, 1967 in Philadelphia, Pennsylvania) and also known by his music industry moniker "X1", is an American Music Executive, Pop Music record producer, and songwriter. Bythwood is also a former American professional football player who was an NFL Rookie Free Agent acquisition by the Cleveland Browns.  A 6'4", 255 lb Defensive End, Bythwood played at the University of Miami where he received his Bachelors in Business Administration and was also an NCAA Collegiate Football National Champion in 1991 as was determined by the AP Poll. From 1991 to 1994 Bythwood played alongside notable teammates Actor Dwayne Johnson, 2003 Super Bowl Champion and 2013 Pro Football Hall of Fame Inductee Warren Sapp, as well as two-time Super Bowl Champion and 2018 NFL Hall of Fame Inductee, Ray Lewis. Bythwood currently resides in Miami, Florida and has a son Brandin Mikel, born April 8th, 1995.

Music career

2009: Grammy Nomination

As a record producer, Bythwood and then production partner Alex Francis made up the American music production team known as The Ghostwriters.  In 2008 they produced Keyshia Cole's hit single "Heaven Sent", from her multi-platinum-selling album Just like You.  According to Billboard, "Heaven Sent" peaked at #1 on U.S. Hot R&B/Rap Songs chart for nine consecutive weeks and also reached #28 on the U.S. Billboard Hot 100, making "Heaven Sent" Cole's most successful single release to date. The duo subsequently received two Grammy nominations in the categories Best R&B Song and Best Female R&B Performance.

Charice Pempengco
 
In 2011 Bythwood /"The Ghostwriters" collaborated with former American Idol Judge / Grammy Nominated Songwriter Kara DioGuardi and Pop Music Recording Artist Jason Derulo to produce the critically acclaimed song "Lessons for Life" which featured on Warner Bros. Records International Pop star Charice Pempengco's album Infinity. Charice Pempengco is a Philippine International Superstar recording artist and Actor for the hit television series "Glee".  She first rose to prominence as a YouTube  singing sensation and was initially discovered by popular songwriter Haras Fyre (pka Patrick Grant).  Charice was dubbed by media icon Oprah Winfrey as "the most talented girl in the world", which subsequently prompted Winfrey to introduce her to legendary songwriter and 16x Grammy Award-winning music producer David Foster; renowned for his work with Celine Dion, Christina Aguilera, Whitney Houston, Janet Jackson, Michael Jackson, Chaka Khan, Beyoncé Knowles, Nsync, Prince among many other notable music icons.

Musik~Hause Produktionen Internationale

Through his co-publishing joint venture with EMI/Sony ATV, Bythwood's company "Musik~Hause Produktionen Internationale," music production company, enlists a vast network of a number of award-winning, multi-platinum diverse and creatively gifted songwriters and music producers. This very close knit network of talent enables Musik~Hause to produce commercially viable music and develop young, new, emerging artist(s) within the music industry for distribution.

Corporately based in Miami, with office locations in Atlanta, New York, Los Angeles and London, Musik~Hause has strategic partnerships and joint ventures with some of the music industry's top record labels. These partnerships have yielded several Grammy Awards for a number of Multi-Platinum recording artist(s).  Bythwood explains:  "As CEO and Principal Managing Partner, I'm extremely excited about what we've achieved and continued opportunities to forge great relationships with some of the industry's finest talent."  It is paramount that our Producer(s), Artist(s), Writer(s), and Engineer(s) have an environment and industry support system that is conducive to success"… and why these joint venture(s) and collabratives keep Musik~Hause on the fore front and cutting edge of music technology and cultivates an environment that fosters great music.

Musik Hause, through its joint collaborative with Sony Music, Fox, and NBC, has cultivated the projects of a number of "Stand Out Top Tier" performers from NBC's "The Voice", FOX's "American Idol" and "X Factor" respectfully. Through this venture Musik Hause/Sony ATV concentrations have been the artist development and production of those standout performers that were eliminated from competition. Roster collaborations have included NBC's "The Voice (U.S. season 3)" Contestant Joselyn Rivera. In addition to Joselyn Rivera, Bythwood has worked with American Idol (season 11) Finalist/Runner-up Jessica Sanchez, NBC "The Voice (U.S. season 4) standout performer Monique Abaddie, American Idol (season 11) Contestant Deneco Pittman (Neco Starr) and contestant Tion Phipps among others.

An ardent believer in "Reality TV" talent based shows; Bythwood's work with Simone Cowell's "SYCO/Sony Music Entertainment" recording artists and UK "X Factor" Winners, Leona Lewis and Alexandra Burke helped to further solidify Musik Hause's artist developmental philosophy. Bythwood explains: "Many talented artist become Superstar icons because of phenomenal songs and a great team surrounding them."  Talented singers are not ALWAYS great songwriters which is why our approach at Musik Hause is to operate within the framework of helping artist create or providing them with the possible music composition that helps them win and succeed.

Simply stated, we help deliver commercially viable product in line with label(s) needs while simultaneously and seamlessly maintaining artist integrity and creativity. All of this is done in pursuit of the primary goal of ultimately producing records that fans and music lovers will love and long appreciate while allowing labels to see a return on investment.

References

External links 
 https://web.archive.org/web/20091204021608/http://www.fanbase.com/Dinavon-Bythwood
 http://www.x1muzik.com/ 
 
 The Ghostwriters on Myspace

1967 births
Living people
Record producers from Pennsylvania
Players of American football from Pennsylvania